John Henry Scott (4 February 1897 – 1970) was an English professional footballer who played as an inside forward for Sunderland.

References

1897 births
1970 deaths
People from Langley Park, County Durham
Footballers from County Durham
English footballers
Association football inside forwards
Sunderland A.F.C. players
Wolverhampton Wanderers F.C. players
Hull City A.F.C. players
Bradford (Park Avenue) A.F.C. players
Swansea City A.F.C. players
Watford F.C. players
Nuneaton Borough F.C. players
English Football League players